Indus Air was a regional domestic airline based in Ghaziabad, India. Its main base was Indira Gandhi International Airport, Delhi.

History 
In October 2005 it had been reported that baron Kapil Mohan of Mohan Meakins, along with other Indian businessmen, had invested in Indus Airways. They planned to start services by the end of October 2005, using two Bombardier CRJ-200 aircraft leased from Lufthansa. These two CRJ-200LRs were ex Independence Air aircraft from the USA.

Indus Air was established in 2004 and started operations on 14 December 2006. It ceased operations in April 2007.

Destinations

Indus Air operated domestic services to the following destinations:
Amritsar
Chandigarh
Delhi
Mumbai

Fleet
The Indus Air fleet included the following aircraft:

2 Bombardier CRJ-200ER

References

External links
Indus Air
India's Emerging Airline Industry

Defunct airlines of India
Airlines established in 2004
Airlines disestablished in 2007
Indian companies disestablished in 2007
Indian companies established in 2004
2004 establishments in Uttar Pradesh
Companies based in Uttar Pradesh